This is a list of Bulgarian football transfers for the 2016–17 winter transfer window. Only transfers involving a team from the two professional leagues, First League and Second League are listed.

First League

Beroe Stara Zagora

In:

Out:

Botev Plovdiv

In:

Out:

Cherno More

In:

Out:

CSKA Sofia

In:

Out:

Dunav Ruse

In:

Out:

Levski Sofia

In:

Out:

Lokomotiv GO

In:

Out:

Lokomotiv Plovdiv

In:

Out:

Ludogorets Razgrad

In:

Out:

Montana

In:

Out:

Neftochimic Burgas

In:

Out:

Pirin Blagoevgrad

In:

Out:

Slavia Sofia

In:

Out:

Vereya

In:

Out:

Second League

Bansko

In:

Out:

Botev Galabovo

In:

Out:

Botev Vratsa

In:
 

Out:

CSKA Sofia II

In:

Out:

Etar

In:

Out:

Levski Karlovo

In:

Out:

Lokomotiv Sofia

In:

Out:

Ludogorets Razgrad II

In:

Out:

Nesebar

In:
 

Out:

Oborishte

In:

Out:

Pomorie

In:

Out:

Septemvri Sofia

In:

Out:

Sozopol

In:

Out:

Spartak Pleven

In:

Out:

Tsarsko Selo

In:

Out:

Vitosha Bistritsa

In:

Out:

References

Bulgaria
Winter 2016-17